The South Florida Military and Educational Institute was established in 1895 by Evander M. Law in Bartow, Florida, United States, and is considered one of several predecessors of the University of Florida.

It was renamed the South Florida Military College in 1903 and was granted the authority to confer degrees. The school stressed scientific and technological studies. The college was abolished in 1905 by the Buckman Act and some of its civil engineering equipment was transferred to the University of Florida at Gainesville.
The college's remaining building is a historic site located at 1100 South Broadway which served as a dormitory, and after the college's closure as a private home. On July 24, 1972, it was added to the National Register of Historic Places.

References

External links

 Polk County listings at National Register of Historic Places
 Florida's Office of Cultural and Historical Programs
 Polk County listings
 Great Floridians of Bartow

National Register of Historic Places in Polk County, Florida
Defunct United States military academies
Defunct private universities and colleges in Florida
School buildings completed in 1895
Buildings and structures in Bartow, Florida
Vernacular architecture in Florida
1895 establishments in Florida
1905 disestablishments in Florida
Educational institutions disestablished in 1905
Educational institutions established in 1895